Louise Nathhorst (born 26 May 1955) is a Swedish equestrian and Olympic medalist. She was born in Stockholm. She won a bronze medal in dressage at the 1984 Summer Olympics in Los Angeles.

She won the 1997/98 edition of the FEI Dressage World Cup.

References

External links

1955 births
Living people
Sportspeople from Stockholm
Swedish female equestrians
Swedish dressage riders
Olympic equestrians of Sweden
Olympic bronze medalists for Sweden
Equestrians at the 1984 Summer Olympics
Equestrians at the 1988 Summer Olympics
Equestrians at the 1996 Summer Olympics
Equestrians at the 2004 Summer Olympics
Olympic medalists in equestrian
Medalists at the 1984 Summer Olympics